Eucyclopera cynossema is a moth of the family Erebidae first described by Herbert Druce in 1894. It is found in Mexico and Guatemala.

References

Nudariina
Moths described in 1894